Towns under the federal government management:
Znamensk (Знаменск)
Cities and towns under the oblast's jurisdiction:
Astrakhan (Астрахань) (administrative center)
city districts:
Kirovsky (Кировский)
Leninsky (Ленинский)
Sovetsky (Советский)
Trusovsky (Трусовский)
Districts:
Akhtubinsky (Ахтубинский)
Towns under the district's jurisdiction:
Akhtubinsk (Ахтубинск)
Urban-type settlements under the district's jurisdiction:
Nizhny Baskunchak (Нижний Баскунчак)
Verkhny Baskunchak (Верхний Баскунчак)
with 12 selsovets under the district's jurisdiction.
Chernoyarsky (Черноярский)
with 10 selsovets under the district's jurisdiction.
Ikryaninsky (Икрянинский)
Urban-type settlements under the district's jurisdiction:
Ilyinka (Ильинка)
Krasnye Barrikady (Красные Баррикады)
with 15 selsovets under the district's jurisdiction.
Kamyzyaksky (Камызякский)
Towns under the district's jurisdiction:
Kamyzyak (Камызяк)
Urban-type settlements under the district's jurisdiction:
Kirovsky (Кировский)
Volgo-Kaspiysky (Волго-Каспийский)
with 16 selsovets under the district's jurisdiction.
Kharabalinsky (Харабалинский)
Towns under the district's jurisdiction:
Kharabali (Харабали)
with 9 selsovets under the district's jurisdiction.
Krasnoyarsky (Красноярский)
with 16 selsovets under the district's jurisdiction.
Limansky (Лиманский)
Urban-type settlements under the district's jurisdiction:
Liman (Лиман)
with 14 selsovets under the district's jurisdiction.
Narimanovsky (Наримановский)
Towns under the district's jurisdiction:
Narimanov (Нариманов)
with 12 selsovets under the district's jurisdiction.
Privolzhsky (Приволжский)
with 12 selsovets under the district's jurisdiction.
Volodarsky (Володарский)
with 21 selsovets under the district's jurisdiction.
Yenotayevsky (Енотаевский)
with 14 selsovets under the district's jurisdiction.

References

Astrakhan Oblast
Astrakhan Oblast